Manomin County was a county in Minnesota that existed separately for about one year from 1857 to 1858. The land shifted hands among three other counties for the next decade. When it was formed, it was the smallest county in the United States at roughly 18 square miles (47 km2). This land area currently makes up the unusual southward extension of Anoka County between Hennepin and Ramsey counties.

Manomin is a variant spelling of manoomin, the Ojibwe word for wild rice, a staple of their diet. A current Minnesota county, Mahnomen, carries on the name.

The old county was created when it was split from Ramsey County, on May 23, 1857. The county seat was Manomin (present-day Fridley). It was disbanded in 1858 and administratively attached to St. Louis County, Minnesota. Two years later in 1860, it was attached to Anoka County. At the time, the area's population was 136. In 1863, it was attached to Hennepin County, but it was finally merged into Anoka County and eliminated in 1869–1870.

References

 "AniMap Plus, 2.5; County Boundary Historical Atlas;" Alamo, California: The Gold Bug; (Compact Disc)
 Forstall, Richard L., ed.; "Population of States and Counties of the United States 1790 to 1900;" Washington: U.S. Department of Commerce, Bureau of the Census, 1996.
 Kane, Joseph N. and Charles C. Aiken; "The American Counties, 5th edition;" Lanham, Maryland: Scarecrow Press, 2005.
 Minnesota Place Names, Minnesota Historical Society.

Former counties of Minnesota
Anoka County, Minnesota
Hennepin County, Minnesota
Ramsey County, Minnesota
St. Louis County, Minnesota
1857 establishments in Minnesota Territory